SMS1 may refer to:

Sphingomyelin synthase, an enzyme
SMS-1, weather satellite, part of the NASA program Synchronous Meteorological Satellite

See also
 SMS (disambiguation)